Katarzyna Koniuszaniec (Katarzyna Kołodziejska) (born 10 January 1985 in Elbląg) is a Polish handball player. She played for the club EB Start Elbląg, the Polish national team and represented Poland at the 2013 World Women's Handball Championship in Serbia.

Personal life

It  2014 she married Mateusz Kołodziejski, a footballer.

References

External links
Player profile at the Polish Handball Association website 

Polish female handball players
1985 births
Living people
People from Elbląg
Sportspeople from Warmian-Masurian Voivodeship
21st-century Polish women